Geronimo Cruz (12 December 1937- 21 August 2022) is a Filipino former basketball player who competed in the 1960 Summer Olympics.

Basketball career
The four-time national player often called "Gerry" owns the distinction of being the only Filipino basketball star that can be proud to be recruited to play abroad. In 1959, Cruz was drafted to play for the University of San Francisco Dons and he did have a short stint until he was recalled to Manila by his employer Baby Ysmael. 

Gerry saw action in one Olympics (Rome, 1960), one world championship (Santiago, Chile, 1959), one Asian Games (Jakarta, 1962), and one Asian Basketball Confederation (Taipei, 1963). Cruz played for the FEU Tamaraws in his rookie year in 1956 and his heroics in the championship match against UST gave the Tams the UAAP varsity crown.

He was an original member of the famed Ysmael Steel Admirals which Baby Ysmael formed in October 1956. His teammates were Frankie Rabat, Tito Villareal, Tine Literal, Cesar Jota, Serafin Vida, Pablo Belmonte, Apolinar Rosar, Conrado Santos and Carlos Badion.

Cruz retired in 1964 after he reinjured his knee which he suffered in the Admirals game against Crispa where he fell to the floor during an undergoal play and broke his knee.

References

External links
 

1937 births
Living people
People from Guagua
Basketball players from Pampanga
Olympic basketball players of the Philippines
Basketball players at the 1960 Summer Olympics
Asian Games medalists in basketball
Basketball players at the 1962 Asian Games
Philippines men's national basketball team players
Filipino men's basketball players
1959 FIBA World Championship players
FEU Tamaraws basketball players
Asian Games gold medalists for the Philippines
Medalists at the 1962 Asian Games